The Diocese of Mexico is a missionary diocese of the Orthodox Church in America (OCA).  Its territory includes parishes, monasteries, and missions located in four states in Mexico (as well as Mexico City) – Chiapas, México, Jalisco, and Veracruz.  The diocesan chancery is located in Mexico City.

The current ruling bishop of the exarchate is Alejo (Pacheco-Vera), Bishop of Mexico City.

History 

The Mexican Exarchate was created through the mass conversion (some 10,000-20,000 persons) of an entire diocese of the Mexican National Catholic Church to Orthodoxy in 1972. The Mexican National Catholic Church still has four other existing dioceses. Bishop Dmitri (Royster) was the Exarch of Mexico from 1972 to 2008.

October 16, 2008, the exarchate reorganized as the Diocese of Mexico and Bishop Alejo (consecrated on May 28, 2005) was elected as the ruling bishop and installed in Ascension Cathedral in Mexico City on January 18, 2009.

Deaneries 

The diocese is grouped geographically into five deaneries, each consisting of a number of parishes.  Each deanery is headed by a parish priest, known as a dean.  The deans coordinate activities in their area's parishes, and report to the diocesan bishop.  The current deaneries of the Exarchate of Mexico are:

 Mexico City, D.F.
 State of Mexico
 State of Jalisco
 State of Veracruz
 State of Chiapas

External links

Official site (in Spanish)

Churches in Mexico
Mexico
Christian organizations established in 1972
Dioceses established in the 20th century
Eastern Orthodox organizations established in the 20th century
Mexico
Eastern Orthodoxy in Mexico